Nicholas Eden, 2nd Earl of Avon, OBE TD DL   (3 October 1930 – 17 August 1985), styled Viscount Eden between 1961 and 1977, was a British Army officer and, later, a Conservative politician. He was the younger son of Prime Minister Sir Anthony Eden and his first wife, Beatrice (née Beckett).

Career
Eden was educated at Ludgrove School and Eton College.
Called up for National Service, he was commissioned a second lieutenant in the King's Royal Rifle Corps, his father's former regiment, on 20 May 1950. He transferred to a Territorial Army commission with effect from 6 August 1953, in the same rank (seniority from 20 May 1950), and was promoted to acting lieutenant from the same date (seniority from 17 January 1952). He served as ADC to the Governor General of Canada from 1952 to 1953. He was promoted to acting captain on 1 March 1956, to the substantive rank on 3 October 1957 (seniority from 1 March 1956), to acting major on 1 November 1959 and to substantive major on 3 October 1964 (seniority from 1 November 1959.  He was awarded the Territorial Decoration (TD)  in 1965 and was appointed Officer of the Order of the British Empire (OBE) in the 1970 New Year Honours for his military service. Regimentally within the Territorial Army he served from 1953 with Queen Victoria's Rifles and from 1961 to 1970 its successor the Queen's Royal Rifles. He was appointed an ADC (TAVR) to the Queen in 1978.

He was appointed a Deputy Lieutenant of the Greater London county in 1973 and Vice Chairman of the Greater London TAVR Association.

Eden succeeded to the earldom on the death of his father in 1977, his elder brother Pilot Officer Simon Gascoigne Eden having been killed in action in June 1945, while serving as a navigator with the RAF in Burma.

Government service
Having risen to the rank of lieutenant-colonel in the Royal Green Jackets, Lord Avon served under Margaret Thatcher as British Parliamentary delegate to the North Atlantic Assembly from 1979, a Lord-in-waiting from 1980 to 1983, as Under-Secretary of State for Energy from 1983 to 1984 and as Under-Secretary of State for the Environment from 1984 until his resignation because of ill health in March 1985, shortly before his death.

Personal life
Widely known to have been homosexual, Lord Avon was unmarried and died from complications related to AIDS at the age of 54.  The cause of death on the death certificate was stated as meningoencephalitis or "inflammation of the brain." Upon his death, his titles became extinct.  At the time of his death, The News of the World identified a man "listed as authorizing cremation of Avon’s body as an antiques dealer who lived with Avon in Holland Park."

The character of Peter Morton in the 1992 film Peter's Friends is said to have been partly inspired by Lord Avon.

Arms

References

External links

1930 births
1985 deaths
King's Royal Rifle Corps officers
Queen Victoria's Rifles officers
People educated at Eton College
Politicians from London
Officers of the Order of the British Empire
Children of prime ministers of the United Kingdom
Conservative Party (UK) Baronesses- and Lords-in-Waiting
Earls of Avon
LGBT peers
Gay politicians
English LGBT politicians
English gay men
AIDS-related deaths in England
LGBT military personnel
20th-century English LGBT people
People educated at Ludgrove School
Deputy Lieutenants of Greater London